The Studio was a cable television film channel in the United Kingdom and Ireland. It was a joint venture between NTL and Vivendi Universal who each had a 50 percent share.

Overview 
The Studio was announced on 29 September 2000 amid speculation that some Hollywood-based film studios were planning to launch subscription film channels through BSkyB. Ahead of its launch the channel was subject to analysis from the European Commission, who found that the film service would neither create nor reinforce a dominant position in any market. 

The basic subscription channel launched on 1 February 2001 on NTL's analogue cable TV platform, followed by digital on 7 February and NTL Ireland's digital platform in January 2002. At its launch The Studio had access to around 1,000 films, with a selection of both classic titles, as well as newer releases. Films included Born on the Fourth of July, Carlito's Way, Babe, Leaving Las Vegas and Shine. Movies would also be packaged into blocks and strands to attract particular viewers.

NTL had hoped to launch The Studio on other platforms, such as Sky Digital, ONdigital and Telewest, but its failure to do so meant the channel did not reach the number of viewers a deal with another provider would have allowed. 

In May 2001, NTL attempted to sell its stake in The Studio in an effort to stem heavy losses, while Vivendi also began to run into trouble. With NTL and Vivendi deciding the channel was not financially viable despite meeting its financial targets, it was announced on 18 December 2002 that The Studio would close at the end of the month. 

The channel remained on air until the early hours of 1 January 2003, closing after almost two years on air. NTL had agreed to provide a guarantee of £4.2 million in the event of termination of the joint venture, with closure costs totalling £4.8 million.

See also
Studio Universal

References

Television channels and stations established in 2001
Television channels and stations disestablished in 2003
English-language television stations in the United Kingdom
Defunct television channels in the United Kingdom
Movie channels
Movie channels in the United Kingdom